Japan Air Lines Flight 351 was a scheduled passenger flight from Tokyo Haneda Airport to Fukuoka that was hijacked by members of the Red Army Faction of the Japan Communist League on March 31, 1970, in an incident usually referred to in Japanese as the .

Hijacking
Approximately 20 minutes after takeoff, a young man named Takamaro Tamiya got up from his seat, drew a katana and shouted, "We are Ashita no Joe!" He stated his intent to hijack the plane and instructed the other hijackers to draw their weapons. The hijackers then took 129 people (122 passengers and seven crew members) hostage and commanded the pilots to fly the plane to Havana, Cuba, where they intended to receive training by communist military groups. The hijackers were then informed that the aircraft, a Boeing 727, was not capable of making such a journey, due to the plane's inability to hold the necessary amount of fuel. Upon learning of this, the hijackers insisted that the plane be diverted to Pyongyang, North Korea, after stopping to refuel in Fukuoka. Upon arrival at Fukuoka, the police convinced the hijackers to release 23 of their hostages, and the pilots were given a map of the Korean Peninsula. Attached to the map was a note which instructed the pilots to tune their radios to a specific frequency. The air traffic controllers, who were aware of the situation, intentionally gave the pilots incorrect directions in an effort to have them land at Gimpo Airport in Seoul, South Korea, where they had disguised the airport as being North Korean. Despite this, the hijackers quickly realised that they had been tricked, and Japan's Vice Minister for Transport, Shinjiro Yamamura, had volunteered to take the place of the remaining hostages, to which the hijackers accepted. They then proceeded to Pyongyang's Mirim Airport, with Yamamura now as hostage, where they surrendered to North Korean authorities, who offered the whole group asylum.

Using North Korea as a base, they sought to incite rebellion in South Korea and elsewhere across East Asia.  The plane carrying Vice Minister Yamamura and the remainder of the crew was released two days later and returned to its gate at Haneda Airport at 9:39AM on April 5.

Later events
The alleged mastermind of the hijacking, who did not take part in the actual operation, was Takaya Shiomi.  Shiomi was arrested, convicted, and served almost 20 years in prison in Japan.  After his release in 1989, suffering from poor health, Shiomi obtained a lowly paid job as an attendant at a multi-level parking facility in Kiyose, Tokyo, where he was working as late as 2008. He said that they had intended to go to Cuba via North Korea. He joined an antibase movement in Okinawa and an antinuclear campaign, and wrote several books related to the Red Army Faction. In April 2015, he ran in the city assembly elections in Kiyose, campaigning on an anti-Abe platform and against the city's policies which are "bullying" the elderly. He died on November 14, 2017 of heart failure at a Tokyo hospital.

Moriaki Wakabayashi was an early member (bass player) in the long-running avant-garde rock band Les Rallizes Dénudés. In a March 2010 interview with Kyodo News, Wakabayashi stated that the hijacking was a "selfish and conceited" act. Wakabayashi added that he wished to return to Japan and was willing to face arrest and trial for his role in the hijacking. In April 2014 he was still alive, and residing in North Korea together with other members of his group.

In 1985, Yasuhiro Shibata returned to Japan in secret to raise money for the group, was arrested, and was sentenced to five years in prison. Yoshimi Tanaka was arrested in Thailand with a large amount of counterfeit money and repatriated to Japan in March 2000, where he was sentenced; he died before its completion. However, the other hijackers remain at large, according to Japan's National Police Agency.

The leader of the group, Takamaro Tamiya, died in 1995 and Kintaro Yoshida sometime before 1985. Takeshi Okamoto and his wife Kimiko Fukudome were probably killed trying to flee North Korea. Takahiro Konishi, Shiro Akagi, Kimihuro Uomoto and Moriaki Wakabayashi still reside in North Korea; all except Takeshi Okamoto were confirmed to have been alive  when they were interviewed by Kyodo News. In June 2004, the remaining hijackers made a request to North Korean authorities that they be allowed to return to Japan, even if they are to be punished for the hijacking.

Notable passengers

The future Roman Catholic Archbishop and Cardinal Stephen Fumio Hamao was one of the passengers on the flight. Another passenger was Shigeaki Hinohara, who was one of the world's longest-serving physicians and educators. The passengers also included American Pepsi's director, Herbert Brill.

See also

 Red Army Faction (Japan)
 Japanese people in North Korea
 Japan–North Korea relations

References

External links 
Pyongyang Japanese Village 

1970 in Japan
Aircraft hijackings in Japan
Aviation accidents and incidents in 1970
351
Anti-Korean sentiment in Japan
Anti-Japanese sentiment in Korea
1970 in North Korea
March 1970 events in Asia
Terrorist incidents in Japan in 1970
1970 crimes in Japan
Accidents and incidents involving the Boeing 727